Ţurcan or Turcan is a Romanian-language surname that may refer to:

Constantin Țurcan
Jean Turcan
Leonida Ţurcan
 Mihai Țurcan (footballer, born 1989), Moldavian footballer
 Mihai Țurcan (footballer, born 1941), Romanian footballer
Vladimir Ţurcan
Raluca Turcan
Valeriu Turcan

See also
Țurcanu (surname)

Romanian-language surnames